Experimental Neurology is a monthly peer-reviewed medical journal that focuses on research in neuroscience concerning mechanisms underlying neurological disorders. The journal focuses on neural development, neuroregeneration, neuroplasticity, and transplantation,. It was established in 1959 and is published by Elsevier. According to the Journal Citation Reports, the journal has a 2020 impact factor of 5.33. In 1997, Experimental Neurology absorbed the quarterly journal Neurodegeneration, which had been established in 1992.

Past editors-in-chief 
 1959–1975: William F. Windle
 1973–1988: Carmine D. Clemente

References

External links
 

Elsevier academic journals
Monthly journals
Neurology journals
English-language journals
Publications established in 1959
Neuroscience journals